Colle or Collé (French word meaning "glue", Italian word meaning "hill") may refer to:

Places

Canada
Lacolle, municipality in the Quebec province

France
La Colle-sur-Loup, municipality in the Alpes-Maritimes department

Italy
Municipalities (comuni)
Alice Bel Colle, in the Province of Alessandria 
Capriano del Colle, in the Province of Brescia
Colle Brianza, in the Province of Lecco 
Colle d'Anchise, in the Province of Campobasso 
Colle di Tora, in the Province of Rieti 
Colle di Val d'Elsa, in the Province of Siena 
Colle San Magno, in the Province of Frosinone 
Colle Sannita, in the Province of Benevento 
Colle Santa Lucia, in the Province of Belluno 
Colle Umberto, in the Province of Treviso 
Gioia del Colle, in the Province of Bari
Oltre il Colle, in the Province of Bergamo 
Palo del Colle, in the Province of Bari 
San Damiano al Colle, in the Province of Pavia
Santa Giustina in Colle, in the Province of Padua
Santeramo in Colle, in the Province of Bari

Civil parishes (frazioni)
Colle, Bettona, in the municipality of Bettona (PG)
Colle, Monteleone d'Orvieto, in the municipality of Monteleone d'Orvieto (TR)
Colle, Rocca Santa Maria, in the municipality of Rocca Santa Maria (TE)
Colle, Sansepolcro, in the municipality of Sansepolcro (AR)
Il Colle, Gaiole in Chianti, in the municipality of Gaiole in Chianti (SI)
Il Colle-Villa, in the municipality of Calci (PI)

Other uses
Colle (surname)
Colle (grape), another name for the French wine grape Gouais blanc
Muscadelle, another French wine grape that is also known as Colle
Colle System, a chess opening strategy for white

See also
Colli (disambiguation)
Colley (disambiguation), a surname
Lacolle (disambiguation)
La Colle (disambiguation)